The State of North Carolina has a group of twelve protected areas known as State Forests which are managed by the North Carolina Forest Service, an agency of the North Carolina Department of Agriculture and Consumer Services.  The seven of the state forests are known as State Educational Forests, and they are primarily used to educate the public about the forest environment, forestry and forest management.  One state forest, DuPont, was designated as a State Recreational Forest in recognition of its high recreational value and use.  Most of the state forests provide recreational facilities for hiking and picnicking.

North Carolina state forests

See also
 List of U.S. National Forests
 List of North Carolina state parks

Notes

References

External links
  website for the NC Forest Service.

North Carolina